Pirče is a settlement on the left bank of the Kolpa River in the Municipality of Kostel in southern Slovenia. The area is part of the traditional region of Lower Carniola and is now included in the Southeast Slovenia Statistical Region.

There is a small chapel in the settlement dedicated to the Virgin Mary. It dates to the late 19th century.

References

External links
Pirče on Geopedia

Populated places in the Municipality of Kostel